S.A.L.E.M.: The Secret Archive of Legends, Enchantments, and Monsters, otherwise known as Salem or S.A.L.E.M., is an upcoming animated fantasy and mystery web series created by a queer woman named Samantha "Sam" Sawyer. It is based on an unpublished comic of the same name by Sawyer and was funded by a crowdfunding campaign on Kickstarter. The show's exact date has not been announced.

Premise
The story, set in the fictional town of Hollow Watch, West Virginia, follows the adventures of a non-binary cryptid named Salem who finds out they have been adopted and begins on a journey to discover their origin, joined by an enchanted book, a photographer named Oliver, and a psychic named Petra who is a medium for ghosts. Salem, a creature who doesn't have a core identity or gender, travels through a "world of fairies, goblins and other cryptids."

Characters

Main 
 Salem (voiced by Laura Bailey) is a non-binary cryptid who begins their journey to find out who they really are after learning they are adopted. In October 2020, Salem was also confirmed as pansexual. Sawyer described Salem as excitable, willing to learn, and has a "thirst for knowledge."
 Oliver (voiced by Adam McArthur) is a wannabe photographer of cryptids. In October 2020, he was confirmed as a gay character.
 Petra (voiced by Riele Downs) is a psychic medium terrified of ghosts. In October 2020, she was confirmed as an asexual character. In an exclusive interview in January 2021, Downs described Petra as being loyal and figuring out what she is doing with her life.

Supporting
 The Cryptorium (voiced by Rob Paulsen) is the enchanted book that guides Salem on their journey.
 Boogeyman (voiced by Rob Paulsen) is Salem's stepfather.
 Arlo is the older brother of Petra who likes to read, enjoys quiet nights, and is working hard to get in college.

Other characters
 Freddie (voiced by Maisy Kay) is a cat with black fur.
 Bigfoot (voiced by Brock Powell) is a monster in the woods that Salem, Petra, and Oliver encounter.
 Daniel (voiced by Q Fortier)

Production, development, and release
The project itself was envisioned in 2013, but it wasn't until November 2018 that the series started production. Sawyer launched a Kickstarter campaign in order to complete the "first cycle of production" of the series. By November 2019, the crowdfunding campaign had fully funded the series. By February 2021, more than $75,000 had been contributed to the project's Kickstarter. Sawyer noted that while the show has an animation studio helping create episodes, she designs the characters and helps with the storyline.

Sawyer often pointed to the uniqueness of the series. In a January 2020 interview, Sawyer said she always knew this story was about "someone who was different" and noted that the show's "main character identifies as nonbinary," adding that creators are getting better at telling stories about people with disabilities, people of color, and that they are opening up the story "for people who don’t identify with a gender." In a February 2020 interview, Sawyer described the series as "about someone who was different," said that she is aiming to produce a series of episodes that are 11–12 minutes long, and stated that the whole series is mapped out. Sawyer also said that the show is influenced by The Grim Adventures of Billy and Mandy, Courage the Cowardly Dog, and Invader Zim.

For the series, Swampy Marsh will be executive producer and voice director, while Q Fortier will be Senior Producer. Randy Abrams of LostSock LLC will be an executive producer, and Spectrolite is the main storyboarder, along with others working on the series. Marsh's company, Surfer Jack Productions, will be producing the series. On August 13, 2019, the animatic trailer for the series was released, and the opening animation was released on October 17, 2019.

In January 2020, it was predicted that the series would be released "around October 2020." On January 23, 2020, in an AMA, Sawyer stated that the series will be on YouTube but if it doesn't work out, it will be posted to a website where everyone can see the first episode, and stated that they "hope for early 2021" in terms of the release of the first episode. In January 2021, Sawyer stated on Twitter, in response to a question from a fan, that the show is "not out officially yet, but we’re getting closer." In July 2021, Sawyer said that they had to "take a brief hiatus" from posting on the official Twitter account, but that they would be "resuming posts and updates soon." As of December 2021, posting has not resumed on the official Twitter account for the series.

On January 24, 2022, Sawyer told a fan that she couldn't "say anything right now" about the series but would share news "as soon" as she could. On May 21, 2022, one of the show's staff said that she would be able to talk about the series soon, but could not do it at the present.

Notes

References

External links
 
 

American LGBT-related web series
American animated web series
LGBT-related animated web series
English-language television shows
2020s American LGBT-related comedy television series
Upcoming animated television series
Upcoming comedy television series
2020s American animated television series